Said Hadjerrouit   is a professor of informatics and computer science at the University of Agder in Kristiansand, Norway. He got a doctoral degree (Dr.Ing) in 1992 in the field of medical expert systems and artificial intelligence, and a master's degree (1985) in software engineering from the Technische Universität Berlin, Germany. His teaching in Berlin focused mostly on informatics and society, philosophical and ethical issues of computing, and computers in developing countries. In 1991, he moved from Berlin to Kristiansand, Norway, and worked at the Institute of Electronic Data processing at the University of Agder. In 1994, he moved to the Institute of Mathematical Sciences  at the same university, where he was appointed as an associate professor for teaching object-oriented programming, Web engineering, software development, and databases. From 2004, his work shifted to didactics of informatics and computer science education, ICT in mathematics education, ICT-enhanced learning, Web-based learning resources, social software, and Web 2.0 technology. In 2008, Hadjerrouit made a major shift in his research focus from didactics of informatics and Computer Science to mathematics education and use of digital tools in teaching and learning mathematics. He has been teaching the doctoral course “Theories in the Learning and Teaching of Mathematics” since 2014. He is also supervising two PhD students in the field of Flipped Classroom and documentational approach to mathematics education. Hadjerrouit has more than 140 publications in international journals and conference proceedings. He was awarded for Best Paper at Society for Information Technology and Teacher Education Conference (SITE 2010) in San Diego, California, United States, and  IADIS e-Society conference 2012 in Berlin, Germany.

Hadjerrouit is leader of PhD committee for Specialisation in Mathematical Sciences (FDM).

Hadjerrouit is a member of the Agder Academy of Sciences and Letters, with members from Agder, Norway, and from abroad. Hadjerrouit is a member of ISI, and editorial review board of JELLO.

Selected publications
 Hansen, N. K., &; Hadjerrouit, S. (2023). Analyzing Students’ Computational Thinking and Programming Skills for Mathematical Problem Solving. Open and Inclusive Educational Practice in the Digital World. ISBN: 978-3-031-18512-0. Springer Nature, pp. 155-173.
 Stigberg, H.; Hadjerrouit, S.; Kaufmann, O. T.; Marentakis, G. (2022). Analysing tensions faced by pre-service mathematics teachers engaging in digital fabrication. Proceedings of the 45th Conference of the International Group for the Psychology of Mathematics Education (PME 45). ISBN: 978-84-1302-178-2. Universidad de Alicante, pp. 4-51 - 4-58.
Hansen, N.K. &; Hadjerrouit, S. (2021). Exploring Students’ Computational Thinking for Mathematical Problem-Solving: A Case Study. I: Proceedings of the 18th International Conference on Cognition and Exploratory Learning in Digital Age (CELDA2021). IADIS Press 2021, pp. 251-260.
Hadjerrouit, S.; Hansen, N.K. (2020). Students Engaging in Mathematical Problem-Solving through Computational Thinking and Programming Activities: A Synthesis of thwo Opposite Experiences. I: Proceedings of the 17th International Conference on Cognition and Exploratory Learning in the Digital Age (CELDA 2020). IADIS Press 2020; pp. 91-98.
Fleischmann, Y.; Gueudet, G.; Hadjerrouit, S.; Nicolas, P. (2020). Tertiary education in the digital age. International Network for Didactic Research in University Mathematics: INDRUM 2020;Volume 3, pp. 29-46. 
Hadjerrouit, S. (2020). Exploring the Affordances of SimReal for Learning Mathematics in Teacher Education: A Socio-Cultural Perspective. I: Computer Supported Education. 11th International Conference, CSEDU 2019, Heraklion, Crete, Greece, May 2-4, 2019, Revised Selected Papers. Springer Nature 2020, pp.26-50.
Hadjerrouit, S. (2020). Using Affordances and Constraints to Evaluate the Use of a Formative e-Assessment System in Mathematics Education. I: CSEDU 2020 - Proceedings of the 12th International Conference on Computer Supported Education, Volume 1. SciTePress 2020, pp. 366-373.
Fredriksen, H., & Hadjerrouit, S. (2020). Exploring engineering students’ participation in flipped mathematics classroom: A discursive approach. Nordisk matematikkdidaktikk 2020 ;Volum 25.(1), pp. 45-64.
Fredriksen, H., & Hadjerrouit, S. (2019). An activity theory perspective on contradictions in flipped mathematics classrooms at the university level. International Journal of Mathematical Education in Science and Technology 2019, pp.  1-11.
Hadjerrouit, S. (2017). Assessing the Affordances of SimReal+ and their Applicability to Support the Learning of Mathematics in Teacher Education. Accepted for publication in the International Journal “Issues in Informing Science and Information Technology (IISIT)”. Informing Science Institute.
-------. (2015). Evaluating the Interactive Learning Tool SimReal+ for Visualizing and Simulating Mathematical Concepts. Proceedings of 12th International Conference on Cognition and Exploratory Learning in the Digital Age (CELDA 2015). IADIS Press 2015, pp. 101–108(2015). 
-------. (2015). Assessing the Level of Collaborative Writing in a Wiki-Based Environment: A Case Study in Teacher Education. I: Competencies in Teaching, Learning and Educational Leadership in the Digital Age. London: Springer Verlag, 197-216.
------. (2014). Wiki as a Collaborative Writing Tool in Teacher Education: Evaluation and Suggestions for Effective Use. Computers in Human Behavior ;Volume 32, 301-312.
------. (2012). Wiki-based collaborative learning in higher education: a pedagogical Evaluation. Int. J. Innovation and Learning, Vol. 12, No. 1, 2012, pp. 6–26.  (Print),  (Online)
-----. (2010). Developing Web-Based Learning Resources in School Education: A User-Centered Approach.  Interdisciplinary Journal of E-Learning and Learning Objects, Volume 6, pp. 115–135.
-----. (2009). Teaching and Leaning School Informatics: A Concept-Based Pedagogical Approach. Informatics in Education, Volume 8, No. 2, pp. 227–250.
-----. (2005). Constructivism as Guiding Philosophy for Software Engineering Education. ACM SIGCSE Bulletin, Volume 37, Number 4, December 2005, pp. 45–49.

References

University of Agder
Norwegian computer scientists
Living people
Year of birth missing (living people)